Rupert Hitzig (born August 15, 1938) is an American director, producer, actor and screenwriter. He graduated from Harvard University.

Career
With executive producer Berry Gordy he produced The Last Dragon (1985), directed by Michael Schultz and written by Louis Venosta. With Robert Boris he wrote the screenplay for Electra Glide in Blue (1973), directed by James William Guercio and starring Robert Blake, Billy Green Bush and Mitchell Ryan. With Alan Landsburg he produced Jaws 3-D (1983), directed by Joe Alves and James Contner as director of photography.

In early 1974, Hitzig came to Buzz Aldrin's home in Hidden Hills, California to offer a formal proposal for the television movie based on Aldrin book Return to Earth. The film was produced by Alan King and Hitzig, and starred Cliff Robertson.

He was looking to direct his first film for under a million of dollars. Chris Black grabbed a copy of The Boy Who Cried Devil and passed it along. Thanks to Black, Richard Corey, Scott Hill and Hitzig, started Night Visitor (1989).

Filmography

References

External links
 
 
 

1938 births
Living people
American documentary film directors
American documentary film producers
American male screenwriters
American television writers
20th-century American male actors
21st-century American male actors
American male film actors
Male actors from Los Angeles County, California
Harvard University alumni